Wednesbury was a borough constituency in England's Black Country which returned one Member of Parliament (MP)  to the House of Commons of the Parliament of the United Kingdom from 1868 until it was abolished for the February 1974 general election.

Wednesbury became a parliamentary borough under the Reform Act 1867, taking territory that previously belonged to the constituency of South Staffordshire.

Members of Parliament

Boundaries
1868–1885: The parishes of Wednesbury, West Bromwich, and Tipton.

1885-1918: The parishes of Wednesbury, Tipton, and Darlaston.

Over its existence the constituency had five different sets of boundaries, in each case combining the town of Wednesbury with neighbouring communities and reflecting population and local government boundary changes.
  
The new constituency was defined in Schedule B of the Representation of the People Act 1867 as comprising three Staffordshire parishes, namely: Wednesbury, West Bromwich and Tipton. Under the Redistribution of Seats Act 1885 West Bromwich was removed to become a separate constituency. In its place the parish of Darlaston was added to the seat. These boundaries were used until 1918 when the Representation of the People Act redefined constituencies in terms of the local government areas as they existed at the time. The Parliamentary Borough of Wednesbury was to comprise the Municipal Borough of Wednesbury and the Urban Districts of Darlaston and Tipton. The next boundary change, under the Representation of the People Act 1948, came into effect at the 1950 general election. Tipton was removed to become part of a new Rowley Regis and Tipton seat. Wednesbury Borough Constituency now comprised the Borough of Wednesbury and Urban District of Darlaston, to which were added the two urban districts of Wednesfield and Willenhall from the abolished seat of Wolverhampton East.

The final adjustment made was as part of a periodic review under the House of Commons (Redistribution of Seats) Act 1949. This came into effect at the 1955 general election, with Wednesfield transferred to the neighbouring county constituency of Cannock.

There were widespread local government changes in the Black Country in 1966, and all the local government districts making up the constituency were abolished and their areas absorbed into neighbouring county boroughs. This was reflected when the Wednesbury constituency was abolished in 1974, with its area being divided between the seats of Walsall North (Willenhall), Walsall South (Darlaston), and West Bromwich West (Wednesbury).

Elections

Election in the 1860s

The local people were inclined to vote Liberal so there were several contenders for being the Liberal candidate selected, of whom Alexander Brogden was the man nominated. He was by that time, the senior partner in John Brogden and Sons, coal and ironminers, smelters and railway contractors. The other candidates were: Thomas Eades Walker, of the Patent Shaft Works, Conservative and Dr Edward Vaughan Hyde Kenealy, Independent.

The nominations were made on Monday, 16 November 1868 from a wooden husting erected on the South side of the Market Place.  It was a lively occasion with all space taken, including windows and housetops. There was rioting and special constables had to be sworn in. Each candidate arrived in style and made a speech.  By a show of hands organised by the Returning Officer, it was decided that the election would be held on the next day.

On Election Day, 300 police officers were marched into the borough, but again, there was rioting. This was the last general election at which voting was open. The state of the voting was collected hourly from the different booths by mounted messengers and announced. 10,995 voted out of 15,000 voters. The result was:

Election in the 1870s
The second time the seat was contested was at the general election of 1874. Walker, the Conservative candidate at the previous election stood instead at East Worcestershire, where he won a seat. In his place, the Conservatives selected Richard Mills, a Darlaston Ironmaster. The result was:

Elections in the 1880s
In the general election of 1880, Frederick Wootton Isaacson opposed the sitting MP. He withdrew shortly before the contest. However, his name remained on the ballot paper and he received a handful of votes:

At the next general election in 1885, there had been large boundary changes, in particular the removal of West Bromwich to form a separate constituency. The sitting MP did not defend his seat: Brogden's liquidation had been gazetted in January 1884 due to the failure of the family business. In his place, the Liberals selected the Hon. Philip James Stanhope. The Conservatives selected Wilson Lloyd, who gained the seat for the party.

Early in 1886, Gladstone introduced the First Home Rule Bill. The legislation divided the Liberal Party, and a general election was held. At Wednesbury, the same two candidates went to the poll and the result was:

Elections in the 1890s
The same two candidates fought the 1892 general election, with a narrow victory for the Conservatives with a majority of sixty votes:

In 1895, there were two new candidates. The Conservatives selected: Walford Davis Green, a barrister and grandson of Thomas Davis, ironmaster of Hill Top, while the Liberals chose Charles Roberts. Green retained the seat for the Conservatives. The result was:

Elections in the 1900s
The 1900 general election was held at the height of the Second Anglo-Boer War. In this so-called "khaki election", Green, a supporter of the war, held his seat against the Liberal candidate, Enoch Horton, a Darlaston manufacturer.

At the 1906 general election, Green retired and in his place, the Conservatives nominated Alfred Bird, head of the manufacturers of Bird's Custard to defend the seat. The Liberals nominated Clarendon Hyde, a businessman, as their candidate. The Liberals polled well throughout the country, and they won a large majority in the House of Commons. Wednesbury was one of the seats the party gained from the Conservatives, and Hyde won a majority of 944 votes.

Elections in the 1910s
A general election was next held in January 1910: the sitting Liberal MP was opposed by a new Unionist candidate, John Norton-Griffiths, a civil engineer and former army officer. While the election had been called to seek a mandate for the so-called "People's Budget", the campaign in Wednesbury centred on the issue of tariff reform, with both candidates placing large wagers on the effects of policies on future food prices. Norton-Griffiths regained the seat for the Unionists.

The result of the general election in January 1910 was inconclusive and another general election was held in December. Norton-Griffiths retained the seat for the Unionist Party against a new Liberal opponent, with an increased majority.

The next general election was delayed by the First World War, and was not held until late-December 1918. The sitting MP, Sir John Norton-Griffiths, was chosen to stand at Wandsworth Central in London. The Unionists instead nominated Archibald White Maconochie, a former Scottish Liberal Unionist MP and tinned food manufacturer. Norton-Griffiths that he would support the new candidate by flying by London to Wednesbury, to circle the town while dropping election literature and then landing and addressing a mass meeting, before returning to the capital. Permission was refused by the Air Ministry, however. The election was to be a three-sided contest, with Alfred Short, a Sheffield trade unionist, nominated by the Labour Party in addition to R L G Simpson of the Liberals. The Liberal vote collapsed and seat was one of the Labour Party's gains at the election, although the governing wartime coalition led by David Lloyd George won an overwhelming majority.

Elections in the 1920s
At the next general election in 1922, Short was opposed only by a Unionist candidate, Herbert Geraint Williams, an economist who had worked in the Ministry of Munitions during the First World War. Short narrowly retained the seat.

Although the Unionist Party won an overall majority in 1922, another general election was held at the end of 1923. This followed the resignation of Prime Minister Bonar Law in May 1923 and concerns over unemployment and protectionism. The new Conservative Prime Minister, Stanley Baldwin called a general election for December 1923.

The same two candidates contested the constituency, and Short held the seat comfortably as the Labour Party saw an increase in votes.

The 1923 general election resulted in a hung parliament. Following the collapse of a short-lived minority Labour government, another general election was held in October 1924.

The Unionists chose a new candidate, Benjamin Garnet Lampard-Vachell, an international hockey player. Despite a drop in the Labour vote, Short held the seat by a slim majority.

The next general election was held in May 1929. Four candidates were nominated: the sitting MP, Alfred Short for Labour; Harold Rubin for the Unionists, J. H. Stockdale for the Liberals and Thomas Gee who stood as "The Workers' Candidate". The campaign was very ill-mannered: Rubin issued writs alleging slander against Short, and Gee and was hospitalised after he was hit on the head with a brick thrown at him whilst delivering a speech on 20 May. Short held the seat with an increased majority.

Elections in the 1930s
The 1929 general election led to a short-lived minority Labour Party government. The Labour Party split and a National Government was formed in August 1931. The National Government, comprising four parties (National Labour, Conservatives and two factions of the LIberal Party), went to the country in a general election in October 1931. The sitting MP, Alfred Short, remained with the main section of the Labour Party in opposition to the National Government. The National Government won a large majority: their candidate at Wednesbury, Viscount Ednam, a businessman and former Member of Parliament, unseated Short.

Ednam only served as the Member of Parliament for Wednesbury for about eight months: on 29 June 1932 his father died and he inherited the title of Earl of Dudley and was elevated to the House of Lords. A by-election was held in July 1932: a new Labour candidate, John William Banfield, a trade union official, regained the seat for the party against the Conservative nominee, Captain Rex Davis, formerly of the Middlesex Regiment.

The next general election was held in November 1935. The National Government candidate was the Rev. Herbert Dunnico, a former Labour Party MP, who had lost his seat in 1931 after which he switched to supporting the government. Banfield held the seat for Labour with a reduced majority.

Election in the 1940s
Following the outbreak of the Second World War in 1939, the life of the parliament elected in 1935 was extended, with the next general election not being held until July 1945. The sitting MP, J. W. Banfield, died on 25 May 1945 so the seat was vacant for the final few weeks of the parliament.

The Labour Party selected: Stanley Evans, a Birmingham-born industrialist, to defend the seat. His only opponent was Sebastian Earl, a champion rower and member of the National Labour Organisation. National Labour dissolved itself in June 1945, and Earl stood as a "National" candidate supporting the minority Conservative administration of Winston Churchill. The election resulted in a landslide Labour victory, and Evans was elected with a majority of nearly 16,000 votes.

Elections in the 1950s
The next general election was held in 1950. Evans was opposed by both Conservative and Liberal candidates. Henry Wilkins, a managing director of Wilkins & Mitchell Limited, washing machine manufacturers of Darlaston, was the Conservative candidate. The Liberals nominated J Bowker, a land agent and former chairman of the Worcestershire Liberal Federation. The constituency's boundaries had been considerably altered, and Evans held the redrawn seat with a similar majority to the one that he had achieved in 1945.

The 1950 general election resulted in a Labour government with a very slim majority in the House of Commons. In October 1951, the Prime Minister, Clement Attlee, called a general election seeking to increase his party's majority.

At Wednesbury, there was straight fight between Labour and the Conservatives, who nominated the same candidates as in the previous year. Evans was re-elected with a reduced majority.

The 1951 general election, resulted in a Conservative government under the leadership of Winston Churchill. In April 1955, Anthony Eden succeeded Churchill as Prime Minister, and he called a general election in the following month.

There were once again two candidates at Wednesbury. The sitting Labour Party MP, Stanley Evans was opposed by Ronald Hall, a divisional inspector for the West Midlands Gas Board, running for the Conservative Party. Evans retained the seat, which had substantially changed boundaries.

In November 1956, there was a vote of confidence in the Conservative government caused by the Suez Crisis. Evans abstained on the vote, being the only Labour MP not to follow the party whip. Although he was not disciplined by the Parliamentary Labour Party, the Wednesbury Divisional Labour Party were highly critical of him. On 17 November the Divisional Party unanimously passed a resolution calling on him to resign, and on 20 November Evans announced his resignation from both the House of Commons and the Labour Party. He formally resigned his seat by taking the office of Crown Steward and Bailiff of the three Chiltern Hundreds of Stoke, Desborough and Burnham on 26 November.
The resulting by-election was held on 28 February 1957. The Labour Party selected John Stonehouse, a lecturer who had previously unsuccessfully contested two general elections at Twickenham and Burton-upon-Trent. The Conservatives chose Peter Tapsell, a former member of the Conservative Research Department. An independent candidate, Wolverhampton solicitor Michael Wade, announced his candidacy hours before the close of nominations on 18 February.

Stonehouse held the seat for Labour with an increased majority.

The next general election was held in October 1959. The Conservative government, now under the leadership of Harold Macmillan, was re-elected with an increased majority. At Wednesbury, there was a three-way contest with Stonehouse holding the seat for Labour against the Conservative candidate Ernest Knight, Chairman of the West Midlands Conservative Teachers' Association, and Francis Wilmott, an industrialist standing for the Liberal Party.

Elections in the 1960s
The next general election was held in October 1964. Macmillan had resigned from the premiership in October 1963, and his successor, Alec Douglas-Home, failed to win the election for the Conservatives. The Labour Party under Harold Wilson won a narrow majority, returning Labour to government after thirteen years in opposition.

John Stonehouse faced a straight fight with the Conservative candidate David Harman, an electrical engineer and member of County Borough of West Bromwich Borough Council. He held the seat with a reduced majority.

Wilson called a general election in March 1966 in an attempt to secure a larger majority. He succeeded, and the Labour Party were comfortably re-elected. At Wednesbury, the same two candidates fought the election, and Stonehouse saw his majority more than double.

Election in the 1970s
The next general election was held in June 1970: the Conservatives under Edward Heath defeated the Labour government. At Wednesbury, the same two candidates fought for a third time. Stonehouse held the seat with a reduced majority.

The constituency was abolished prior to the next election in February 1974. Stonehouse was subsequently elected MP for Walsall North which included part of the abolished seat.

References

Sources 

Politics of Sandwell
Parliamentary constituencies in the West Midlands (county) (historic)
Parliamentary constituencies in Staffordshire (historic)
Constituencies of the Parliament of the United Kingdom established in 1868
Constituencies of the Parliament of the United Kingdom disestablished in 1974
Wednesbury